Australian Maritime Safety Authority (AMSA) is an Australian statutory authority responsible for the regulation and safety oversight of Australia's shipping fleet and management of Australia's international maritime obligations. AMSA maintains Australia's shipping registries: the general and the international shipping registers.

AMSA was established in 1990 under the Australian Maritime Safety Authority Act 1990  and governed by the Commonwealth Authorities and Companies Act 1997. AMSA is an agency within the Department of Infrastructure and Transport. Directors are appointed by the minister. The international treaties which AMSA administers include the Navigation Act 2012 and the Protection of the Sea (Prevention of Pollution from Ships) Act 1983.

Organised sea rescue in Australia was well established during the Second World War. Precursor international arrangements also included usage of a range of warning and communication systems.

AMSA is funded largely through levies on the shipping industry. In the 2010-2011 financial year, AMSA recorded expenses of just over $146 million, with revenue at just under $159 million, creating a surplus of more than $10 million.

Functions
Marine safety activities of AMSA include:
 the provision, operation and maintenance of a network of marine aids to navigation, for example, lighthouses
 ensuring the seaworthiness and safe operation of Australian and foreign vessels in Australian waters, including the enforcement of compulsory pilotage
 administering the certification of seafarers
 the provision of a maritime distress and safety communications network
 the operation of Australia's Rescue Coordination Centre and coordination of search and rescue (SAR) operations for civilian aircraft and vessels in distress and
 the development of a maritime safety commercial vessel legislative framework and operating system.

AMSA aims to protect the marine environment by administering programs to prevent and respond to the threat of ship-sourced marine pollution; and together with the Australian Marine Oil Spill Centre, managing Australia's National Plan to combat pollution of the sea by oil and other noxious and hazardous substances.

It is responsible for administering MARPOL 73/78, an international marine environmental convention designed to minimize pollution of the seas. AMSA can instigate prosecutions itself, but mainly works with states and territories during investigations and enforcement activities such as vessel inspections. 
A recent major AMSA project involved the rewrite of the Navigation Act 1912, the agency's governing statute.

Shipping registers 

AMSA maintains two shipping registers. Ships registered on an Australian shipping register have Australian nationality for international shipping law purposes. Unless otherwise exempt, Australian owned ships are required to be registered on the general or international shipping register if it is a domestic commercial vessel, 24 metres or over in tonnage length, capable of navigating the high seas, or any vessel travelling overseas. Vessels engaging in international trading that are at least 24 metres in tonnage length and wholly owned or operated by Australian residents, or by Australian residents and Australian nationals may apply to be registered on the international register. There are tax incentives for ships on the international register to make the register competitive with other registers, such as vessels being operated with mixed crews, with the majority of officers and crew not being required to be Australian citizens or residents. AMSA has delegated certain survey and certification functions to a number of recognised classification societies, which are members of the International Association of Classification Societies.

The Council of Australian Governments (COAG) in 2011 directed AMSA to work co-operatively with the states and territories to create a national system for domestic commercial vessels, including any changes to Commonwealth, state and territory laws and administrative arrangements of the parties that are necessary to facilitate the reform. The new legislation came into effect in 2013, and the transition to the new system was completed in July 2018.

Emergency towage vessel capability 

Coral Knight is an anchor handling tug supply vessel modified to fulfil the role of dedicated emergency towage vessel (ETV). It is the only ETV of its type in Australia and operates in the particularly sensitive sea areas of the northern Great Barrier Reef and Torres Strait.

Coral Knight is also equipped to respond to other maritime incidents such as search and rescue or limiting the effects of ship-sourced pollution of the sea and carries oil pollution response equipment.

Publications
The Authority publishes a range of materials in relation to maritime safety. its maritime survival manual Survival at Sea: A Training and Instruction Manual  is in its 6th edition.

See also

Australian aerial patrol
Coast Guards of Australia

Notes

External links
 

Shipping in Australia
Commonwealth Government agencies of Australia
Maritime safety organizations
Lighthouse organizations
1990 establishments in Australia
Water transport in Australia
Organisations based in Canberra
Regulatory authorities of Australia
Maritime safety in Australia